The Ford Ranges are a grouping of mountain ranges standing east of Sulzberger Ice Shelf and Block Bay in the northwest part of Marie Byrd Land, Antarctica. Discovered by the Byrd Antarctic Expedition on December 5, 1929, they were named by Byrd for Edsel Ford of the Ford Motor Company, who helped finance the expedition.


Geological features

Ranges
The Ford Ranges include a number of mountain groupings and features:

 Allegheny Mountains (Antarctica)
 Chester Mountains
 Clark Mountains
 Denfeld Mountains
 Fosdick Mountains
 Haines Mountains
 Mackay Mountains
 Phillips Mountains
 Sarnoff Mountains
 Swanson Mountains

Mountains
Not a comprehensive list...
 Mount Corey; Chester Mountains
 Mount Darling; Allegheny Mountains
Mount Iphigene; Fosdick Mountains, just west of Ochs Glacier between Marujupu Peak and Birchall Peaks. 
Mackey Rock, Fosdick Mountains, is a large isolated rock eight nautical miles (15 km) southwest of the Mount Iphigene.
Mount Luyendyk; Fosdick Mountains
 Mount Maglione; Clark Mountains
Marujupu Peak;  Fosdick Mountains. A conspicuous nunatak standing above the main flow of Ochs Glacier, between Mount Iphigene and Mount Ferranto.
 Mount Peddie; Phillips Mountains
Mount Rea; Sarnoff Mountains. A prominent mountain standing between Arthur Glacier and Boyd Glacier.
 Mount Spencer; Allegheny Mountains
 Mount Stancliff; Denfeld Mountains
 Mount Swartley; Allegheny Mountains
 Mount Tolley; Allegheny Mountains
 Saunders Mountain; Denfeld Mountains

Other features

References

 
Mountain ranges of Marie Byrd Land
Lists of mountain ranges